Yahya Baş (1952 – 9 January 2023) was a Turkish politician who served as a Member of Parliament for İstanbul (III) from Justice and Development Party (AKP) between 2002 and 2007. He was the first Deputy Minister of Transport, Maritime and Communication between 2012–2015 at 61st and 62nd Cabinets. He also was the first Mayor of Güngören between 1992–2002.

References 

|-

1952 births
2023 deaths
Welfare Party politicians
Virtue Party politicians
Justice and Development Party (Turkey) politicians
Members of the 22nd Parliament of Turkey
Mayors of places in Turkey
People from Trabzon